No. 77 Squadron is a unit of the Indian Air Force assigned to Western Air Command. This tactical airlift aircraft will be able to undertake quick deployment of Special Forces in all weather conditions, including airdrops and landings on unprepared or semi-prepared surface even in complete darkness. Capable of undertaking low-level air-to-air refueling to enhance its range, rapid forward basing of personnel and equipment in emergent situations would be one of its multifaceted roles.

History
The First C-130J aircraft was received in February 2011

Lineage
 Constituted as No. 77 Squadron (Veiled Vipers) on 5 February 2011

Aircraft
C-130J Super Hercules

References

077